Jim Henson's Muppet Babies, commonly known by the shortened title Muppet Babies, is an American animated television series produced by Marvel Productions and Henson Associates. The show portrays toddler versions of the Muppets living together in a nursery under the care of a woman known as Nanny, involving the concepts of the power of imagination and creative problem-solving. The idea of presenting the Muppets as children appeared in a dream sequence in The Muppets Take Manhattan (1984), released two months before Muppet Babies debuted. The idea was a success, and Jim Henson liked the idea that it was turned into a cartoon spin-off.

The show aired from September 15, 1984, to November 2, 1991, as part of the Saturday-morning cartoons lineup on CBS. The show received praise from critics and fans, spawned a successful merchandise, and won seven Daytime Emmy Awards (including four consecutive awards for Outstanding Animated Program), as well as a Humanitas Prize. Due to its popularity, the show remained on television in the United States for a decade.

The rights are now held by The Walt Disney Company the acquisition of The Muppets franchise. Outside the United States, the show was distributed by Walt Disney Television. A reboot of the series premiered on Disney Junior on March 23, 2018.

Premise

Overview 
The Muppet Babies live in a large nursery watched over by Nanny, who is seen only from the shoulders down. The babies' imaginary games transition from the nursery into scenes that become "real" to the babies, such as outer space and the past. Often, these fantasies have the babies interact with live-action backgrounds, old films and photos, engravings, and hand-drawn backgrounds. The babies used their imaginations to have their own adventures based on everyday things and toys around them. They also use their imaginations to solve a problem, but occasionally their imaginations run away with them.

In post-credits scenes, the babies are doing something related to the episode's plot, either in their imaginations or reality, sometimes with an appearance by Nanny. Their activities (mostly Gonzo's) are interrupted by Animal who crashes the scene in a comedic way and calls "Go bye-bye!"

Characters 
The series stars Kermit the Frog, Miss Piggy, Fozzie Bear, Animal, Scooter, Skeeter, Rowlf the Dog, and Gonzo as the main characters in their baby counterparts. Scooter's twin sister, Skeeter, was unique to the Muppet Babies animated series, having no live-action puppet incarnation, although she did appear in the "Family Reunions" issues from the Boom Kids! comic adaptation of The Muppet Show.

Supporting characters include Bunsen Honeydew, Beaker, and Camilla in the form of Gonzo's stuffed baby chick. In the final two seasons, Bean Bunny and Statler and Waldorf began making regular appearances. Several Muppets made guest appearances, including Janice as an older preteen, and Kermit's nephew Robin as a tadpole.

Cast 
 Frank Welker as Baby Kermit, Baby Beaker, Baby Skeeter (1986–91), Camilla, Irma/Charlie (ep. 12), The Chief Inspector of Scotland Yard (ep. 31), Polly the Parrot (ep. 38), Adult Kermit (looped dialogue, ep. 45), Bosko the Snowman (ep. 100)
 Laurie O'Brien as Baby Piggy, Captain Black Wig (ep. 36)
 Greg Berg as Baby Fozzie, Baby Scooter
 Russi Taylor as Baby Gonzo, Baby Robin, Aunt Fanny, and Camilla (occasionally)
 Katie Leigh as Baby Rowlf, Mrs. Mitchell
 Dave Coulier (1986–91) as Baby Animal, Baby Bunsen, Baby Bean Bunny, Baby Janice, Uncle Statler and Waldorf, Camilla (occasionally), Himself (ep. 91)
 Howie Mandel (1984–86) as Baby Skeeter, Baby Animal, Baby Bunsen
 Barbara Billingsley as Nanny

Additional
 Peter Cullen as Smoggy the Bear (ep. 33), Football-Playing Bear (ep. 33), Sor-Elbow (ep. 33)
 Pat Fraley as Announcer
 Tress MacNeille as Skater Ka

Episodes

Production

Origin 
The idea was originated in Jim Henson's art department. During the creation of Sue Venning's Muppet Show Bill, Jim Henson suggested to include the Muppets as "tiny little selves and afterwards, as babies." The book was not changed, but the idea was described as "charming". Afterwards, the staff, including Michael K. Frith, created sketches and drawings of the Muppet Babies. After Frith showed a sketch of Baby Piggy to Jim Henson, Henson decided to turn it into a merchandise. Throughout 1983, several marketers promoted prototype versions of the Muppet Babies with playsuits, underwear, dresses, and overalls while Jim Henson was developing baby versions of the Muppets. On January 1, 1984, the Muppet Babies were included in the comic strip adaptation of the Muppets.

The Muppet Babies appeared in The Muppets Take Manhattan. They were included in Miss Piggy's musical fantasy sequence of its imagined early lives of the Muppets, such as Kermit and Miss Piggy. The pitch was an idea that was not in the script, replacing Miss Piggy's original fantasy sequence from the screenplay. The art department asked the workshop to create models of the puppets of the Muppet Babies. The staff of the workshop favored the idea and decided to include them in the film. Despite Frank Oz's dislike on the idea, he thought that the idea was brilliant. The scene was shot on August 28, 1983. It is considered to be one of the most difficult scenes to shoot during production of the film, as the puppeteers had to perform the baby versions of the characters by using their "stubby little limbs."  The idea was a success, and it received very favorable reviews from fans. At the same time, Baby Kermit and Piggy plush toys were promoted by Pampers.

A music video of Henson's self-directed "I'm Gonna Always Love You", combined with scenes of the film and new footage, was created for MTV. The song was remixed by John Benitez for the project. It was shot on April 10 and 11, 1984. The set used for the music video was larger than the set used in the film. The video became an airplay hit and received a nomination for Best Achievement in Music Video in the VPA Monitor Awards in 1985. Additionally, Jim Henson received a nomination for Best Director for the video.

Development 
The concept of the show was created on March 10, 1984. Network executives and several others suggested Henson Associates to transform the Muppet Babies into a Saturday-morning cartoon. On April 13, 1984, CBS colleague, Judy Price, granted permission to Jim Henson and his staff for its proposal. Jim Henson was initially skeptical, as he thought it would not have as much educational value as Sesame Street. However, he liked the idea a lot that he decided to create the show. He visited every major studio in California, choosing to work with Marvel Productions after a meeting with Hank Saroyan. For the core theme of the show, Henson and Marvel Productions agreed to implement the theme of the power of creativity and encouragement of imagination.
Bob Richardson transferred from producing and directing the first season of Dungeons & Dragons, to develop, produce and direct Muppet Babies, which needed help getting started. Bob stayed with the series through the first 84 episodes.
Scooter's twin sister, Skeeter, was exclusively created for the show to provide more feminine empowerment. Nanny being seen only from the neck down was done to represent the kids' view of an adult.

Writing 
The team of writers consisted of Jeffrey Scott, Barry O'Brien, Bob Smith, Chuck Lorre, Sindy McKay, Larry Swerdlove, Star Kaplan, Maia Mattise, Barbara Beck, Stephen Robertson, Kathy Selbert, Rich Fogel, Mark Seidenberg, Ken Koonce, David Wiemers, Hank Saroyan, Lois Becker, Mark Stratton, J.R. Young, and Tony Marino. All of the writing scripts for the show were done in Marvel Productions. Jeffrey Scott wrote all 13 episodes of the first season.

Voice actors 
The show had several cast members: Frank Welker, Laurie O'Brien, Greg Berg, Russi Taylor, Katie Leigh, Howie Mandel, Dave Coulier, and Barbara Billingsley. By the third season, Howie Mandel left the show, and his roles were given to Frank Welker as Baby Skeeter and Dave Coulier as Baby Animal and Baby Bunsen.

Henson and other puppeteers, such as Frank Oz and Richard Hunt, decided to not reprise their roles due to scheduling conflicts with their work on Sesame Street, Fraggle Rock, and any Muppet special. The team decided to set up auditions for an amount of voice cast that would voice the characters for the series. According to Laurie O'Brien, the audition had gathered 750 people. Katie Leigh was cast as Baby Rowlf, as Hank Saroyan described her as "one of the only people who really knew who Rowlf is." Laurie O'Brien did the audition process by imitating Baby Piggy with a mix between Miss Piggy and her "million dollar voice" while watching a videocassette rental of The Great Muppet Caper in her friend's house. Brien was cast due to her potential and physical strength with her character, although, she also auditioned as Baby Gonzo. Greg Breg did the audition process a few years after he moved to Hollywood. All of the voices were recorded in various recording studios in Los Angeles.

For the songs, some of the voice cast never had a singing experience prior to the show. Katie Leigh started singing lessons before she recorded the songs. Due to Howie Mandel not having a sense of tune and rhythm, a professional singer was hired to sing to keep him on key.

Animation 
For the animation, Henson's idea was to mix genres and ignore "hard-and-fast rules." Characters and backgrounds were created by artists of Marvel Productions. Due to budget constraints, an idea was made by making Jeffrey Scott incorporate live-action footage and photographic backgrounds into the show for the Muppet Babies' imaginations to have reality. The idea was well-liked, and it became one of the main concepts of the show, as it helped save money for animation. It was considered easy for Henson to secure the rights to films such as Star Wars and Raiders of the Lost Ark since he was friends with George Lucas and Steven Spielberg. 

In order for 107 episodes to be produced, Henson and Marvel hired two companies: Toei Animation for seasons 1–3 and the first five episodes of season 4, and AKOM for episode six of season 4 through season 8.

Music 
The show had approximately 100 of the songs co-written by Alan O'Day and Janis Liebhart. The theme song and "Rocket to the Stars" were written by Hank Saroyan and Rob Walsh, and "Merry-Go-Round", "Dreams for Your Inspiration", "Camilla", and "Best Friends" were written by Scott Brownlee. The song that played during the ending credits was laughingly titled "Hank in the Box" in deference to Hank Saroyan. Most episodes have a song per minute. The seventh season episode "Sing a Song of Superheroes" had nine minutes of songs that required extra recording studio work. Some songs were extended for the albums.

Due to an limited amount of the cast having singing talents, all of the songs were recorded with separate voice sessions in a recording studio. The songs and dialogue included in its debut album, Rocket to the Stars, were mixed by Hank Saroyan, Rob Walsh, and Geni Jackson at Wilder Brothers Studio.

During the first season, the show incorporated a "doo-wop feel" of the theme song to carry over the music. As the show evolved, more musical genres were involved, including a more contemporary sound, which often parodies and references popular songs at its time.

Themes 
The show focuses on the central ideas of the power of imagination and creative problem-solving to promote an educational concept of creativity. Hank Saroyan considered the idea as Jim Henson's vision for children to "believe that anything is possible." The techniques of imaginations contributed to the show, such as live-action footage and photographic backgrounds, was stated to interconnect ideas, stories, and characters in a dramatic play. Winnicott, a psychoanalytic theorist, described the show as "the intermediate area... allowed to the infant between primary creativity and objective perception based on reality-testing." Author Marsha Kindle described the show's techniques as the "kind of transgressive identification across other borders" and a "specialty." 

Other frequent themes involve new ways to play with old toys, imagining adulthood, and facing common childhood firsts. Diane LaBlanc of The Defender analyzed that the moral of the first-season episode "Scooter's Hidden Talent" is finding and developing "inspiration and talent". In the book Playing with Power in Movies, Television, and Games, the sixth-season episode "The Green Ranger" was analyzed for its transmedia intersexuality, commodified masquerade, obsolescence, and death to address readers who are concerned about children's interactions on Saturday-morning shows. The seventh-season episode "Sing a Song of Superheroes" included popular opera arias to interest younger viewers in opera. The episode was served as an unofficial tribute to Jim Henson.

Release

Broadcast 
Muppet Babies premiered on September 15, 1984, at 9:00 am (EST) as part of the Saturday-morning lineup on CBS. During the 1984–1985 television season, the show competed with NBC's The Smurfs.

For a brief run in the second season, the program became Muppets, Babies, and Monsters, and a second half-hour was dedicated to a new show called Jim Henson's Little Muppet Monsters. This show featured live-action puppets and cartoons starring the adult Muppet characters. The program lasted from September 14 to September 28, 1985 before Jim Henson pulled the plug, despite 18 episodes having been made. This was reportedly due to the animation suffering from being produced quickly and the characters being lost in translation from live-action to animation, making the animation production harder for Marvel Productions to deliver the full season's animated segments in time for airing. As a result, Henson and CBS was unhappy about the product. The show then reverted to two episodes of Muppet Babies. In the 1987–1988 television season, Muppet Babies was expanded to three episodes after CBS pulled Garbage Pail Kids before it even aired due to controversy. After the series ended, CBS continued to air reruns of the series until the fall of 1992.

On September 18, 1989, the show had an official syndication debut on Claster Television for the 1989–1990 television season. In the 1991–1992 television season, the show reran on Fox. On October 5, 1992, the show started reruns on Nickelodeon. The show continued reruns on the network until 1998. The show reran on Odyssey Network from 1999 to 2000.

Home media 
Although not every Muppet Babies episode was released on VHS, a number of them were released between 1988 and 1999 in the United States. Kraft Foods offered two Muppet Babies tapes sponsored by Kraft Marshmallows in 1989. Jim Henson Video and Buena Vista Home Video released Explore with Us, Let's Build, and Time to Play on January 29, 1993, pricing at $12.99 per tape. The home video series, Yes, I Can, was released with Yes, I Can Learn and Yes, I Can Help on June 16, 1995 and Yes, I Can Be a Friend on August 11, 1995 as part of Jim Henson's Preschool Collection, pricing at $12.99 per tape. The series focused on Robin the Frog, who asks his uncle Kermit for assistance in different chores he was struggling with. Each tape included two Muppet Babies episodes. In 1999, Interactive Learning Group released three Muppet Babies tapes for the Video Buddy interactive video play system, pricing at $15.95 per tape.

In 2003, four episodes were made available, in uncut form, as bonus DVDs with 10-inch Muppet Babies plush toys distributed by Toy Play: "The Daily Muppet", "Eight Take Away One Equals Panic", "Piggy's Hyper-Activity Book", and "Gonzo's Video Show". There have been no plans announced of other DVD releases of Muppet Babies.

Reception

Ratings 
Muppet Babies proved highly popular with audiences. In the 1984–1985 television season, the show was ranked as the most popular Saturday-morning cartoon on CBS and in the top five of 42 network shows. In 1985, the ratings for Muppet Babies increased from the previous season after the program Muppets, Babies, and Monsters was replaced by two episodes of Muppet Babies. As of 1986, it was the second most popular children's programming among the top 30, and it attracted more than four million audiences on each week. It was also very popular with licensees at the time.

Despite the success, ratings has decreased over time. In the 1989–1990 television season, the show only garnered a 2.4 Nielsen household rating with a 14% share due to competition with Garfield and Friends and Teenage Mutant Ninja Turtles at the time. Despite the decrease in ratings, the show still had success with the 2-11 and 6-11 age groups, garnering a 4.6 Nielsen rating with a 55% share in the 2-11 age group and a 4.9 Nielsen rating with a 63% share in the 6-11 age group.

Critical reception 
The show received praise from critics.

The show was conceived as an advanced social message for children by author and psychologist Gordon L. Berry. 

Frank Oz disliked the idea of the Muppet Babies, although he understood the potential of the idea.

Accolades 
Between 1985 and 1991, Muppet Babies gained twelve awards from 27 nominations, including four consecutive Daytime Emmy Awards for Outstanding Animated Program. On August 1, 1985, the show became the first recipient to receive an award for Outstanding Animated Program at the Daytime Emmy Awards. It continued to win the category until 1989, holding a record for the most wins in the category (tied with Arthur). In 1985, Jeffrey Scott received a Humanitas Prize for "Eight Take Away Equals Panic", which earned him a $10,000 prize.

Honors 
Muppet Babies was voted "Top Cartoon of the Childhood Days" by the Irvin Hall newspaper's weekly review of the Pennsylvania State University in 2007.

In January 2009, IGN named Jim Henson's Muppet Babies as the 31st-best in the Top 100 Best Animated TV Shows.

Impact and legacy 
The Muppet Babies was known to start a trend of relaunching popular cartoon characters as younger versions of themselves. This trend can be seen in numerous TV series such as A Pup Named Scooby-Doo, The Flintstone Kids, Tiny Toon Adventures (the main characters actually are the "successors" of the Looney Tunes, the latter themselves as their instructors), and Tom & Jerry Kids.

As of 2000, approximately 300,000 animated cels of the show were stored by the Jim Henson Company Archives off-site.

In 2007, a specific case dedicated to the show was added in The Jim Henson Exhibit in Leland, Mississippi.

Other media

Albums 
There were two Muppet Babies albums produced and released. Both albums were produced by Hank Saroyan and Rob Walsh and featured extended versions of songs from certain Muppet Babies episodes.

The first album, Rocket to the Stars, was released in July 1985 by Parker Brothers Music on LP and cassette. It featured a fully produced stereo story-adventure starring the Muppet Babies characters in which the songs were woven into an all-new story written by Hank Saroyan. It was reissued on July 20, 1987, by Columbia Records. The album, renamed Rock It to the Stars, got its first CD release in 1993 by Jim Henson Records and BMG Kidz. Peter Fawthrop of AllMusic gave the album four stars, praising the songs and voices, but criticized the storybook format of the album, including the "dramatic lengths" and "loaded dialogue".

The second album, Music is Everywhere, was released on July 20, 1987, by Columbia Records on LP and cassette. The album included "Amadogus", which was released as a single in the same year. The song was chosen as a Featured Pick by Cashbox, stating that the "playful tune could garner notoriety as a novelty hit."

Comics
In 1985, Marvel Comics produced a monthly comic book of the Muppet Babies with their Star Comics imprint, drawn by Marie Severin. The idea was created by Guy Gilchrist, who submitted approximately twenty samples to Jim Jenson, along with a multi-panel strip. The series lasted for 26 issues. The last two issues, #25 (May 1989) and #26 (July 1989), were drawn by Nate Butler. In 1992, Harvey Comics acquired the rights to produce Muppet Babies comics and produced a further three issues (restarting at issue #1).

The Muppet Babies also appeared in Star Comics Digest (also known as Star Comics Magazine). This comic was printed in digest-size format, and features a number of reprinted short stories in each issue. The series itself lasted for thirteen issues from 1986 until 1988. The Muppet Babies appeared in some, but not all, of the issues. Other short stories contained in Star Comics Digest included Madballs, Heathcliff, the Care Bears, and Top Dog.

Live performances 
Muppet Babies had three live performances produced throughout 1986 to 1990. They are produced by VEE Corporation and featured performers in oversized costumes dancing and acting. The production values built in Minneapolis, including the sets, properties, costumes, and lightings, costed $1 million. Muppet Babies Live! toured around the United States in 1986. The same premise followed with Muppet Babies' Magic Box in 1987 and Muppet Babies' Where's Animal? in 1988, which ended in May 1990. Each tour involved 16 cast members, eight crew members, concession staff, and support office staff and ended after 40 cities. All of the voices and music were recorded, and the costumes were produced in Henson Associates, to retain authenticity. Andrew Carl Wilk, director of the live performances, stated that directing them from prerecorded voices to costumes and movements was difficult.

For the live performances, professional dancers auditioned in New York City, Los Angeles, and Minneapolis to fill in roles. Once they were cast by the director and choreographer, they rehearsed in Minneapolis for up to 10 hours per day in three weeks. When the show toured, the production stage would be constructed with sets, properties, and lighting for four to seven hours. Once an engagement was done, the dancers were transported by a chartered bus. They had a travel day on each Monday and a day off on each Tuesday. When the tours ended, they traveled back to their homes across the United States six times.

2018 reboot

On October 26, 2016, it was announced that a reboot of the series began production. As opposed to the traditional animation of the original show, the reboot used CGI, but is still targeted to children ages 4–7 with each episode consisting of two 11-minute stories. Mr. Warburton, creator of Cartoon Network's Codename: Kids Next Door, served as the executive producer while former SpongeBob SquarePants writer Eric Shaw served as the story editor. A reboot of the series premiered on Disney Junior on March 23, 2018.

Other appearances 
In 1987, the live-action version of the lead characters appeared, in the form of an old home movie, during A Muppet Family Christmas. The segment itself was cut from American and Canadian home video releases due to copyright licensing issues with "Santa Claus Is Coming to Town".

In 1990, Baby Kermit, Piggy, and Gonzo made small appearances in the drug prevention television special Cartoon All-Stars to the Rescue.

See also
 List of animated spin-offs from prime time shows
 Sesame Beginnings

References

External links

 
 
 
 
 Muppet Babies on IMDB

1984 American television series debuts
1991 American television series endings
1980s American animated television series
1990s American animated television series
American children's animated adventure television series
American children's animated comedy television series
American children's animated fantasy television series
American children's animated musical television series
American prequel television series
American television series with live action and animation
CBS original programming
Child versions of cartoon characters
Daytime Emmy Award for Outstanding Animated Program winners
English-language television shows
Animated television series about children
Television series by Marvel Productions
Star Comics titles
Nick Jr. original programming
Television shows adapted into comics
Television series by Claster Television
Television series by The Jim Henson Company
Television series by Disney–ABC Domestic Television
The Muppets television series
YTV (Canadian TV channel) original programming